Erast Ernestovich Osipyan (born 15 January 1965) is a former Russian professional footballer of Armenian descent.

Club career
He made his professional debut in the Soviet Second League in 1982 for FC Dynamo Stavropol.

References

1965 births
Russian people of Armenian descent
Living people
Soviet footballers
Russian footballers
Association football midfielders
FC Dynamo Stavropol players
FC Armavir (Armenia) players
FC Ararat Yerevan players
FC Lada-Tolyatti players
FC Znamya Truda Orekhovo-Zuyevo players
Soviet Top League players
Russian Premier League players
FC Mashuk-KMV Pyatigorsk players
Soviet Armenians